Events in the year 2017 in Luxembourg.

Incumbents
Monarch: Henri
Prime Minister: Xavier Bettel

Events
12 to 13 January – Luxembourg is affected by the Cyclone Egon

Deaths

17 January – Heng Freylinger, Olympic wrestler (b. 1926).

20 April – Fernand Leischen, fencer (b. 1919).

References

 
2010s in Luxembourg
Years of the 21st century in Luxembourg
Luxembourg
Luxembourg